Firetribe is the debut studio album of The Clay People, released in May 1993 by Re-Constriction Records.

Reception

Jason Anderson of allmusic gave the album a negative review, calling Firetribe "slightly ill-defined" and "one of the group's lesser offerings", but noted that the band would improve on following releases. Aiding & Abetting credited the band for providing the industrial music scene with a unique personality.

Track listing

Personnel
Adapted from the Firetribe liner notes.

Clay People
 Kevin Bakerian – drums
 Alex Eller – keyboards, programming
 Daniel Neet – lead vocals
 Karla Williams – electric guitar

Production and design
 Paul Benedetti – engineering (1-3, 5, 7, 10, 11)
 Rocco Nigro – cover art, illustrations
 Clay People – production, design
 Pete Pryor – cover art
 George Hagegeorge – production (1-3, 5, 7, 10, 11), engineering (4, 6, 8, 9, 12), pre-production (6, 8, 9)
 Mike Rose – design
 Art Snay – production (4, 6, 8, 9, 12), engineering (4, 6, 8, 9, 12)

Release history

References

External links 
 Firetribe at Discogs (list of releases)

1993 debut albums
The Clay People albums
Re-Constriction Records albums